Dalyia is a pterobranch known from the middle Cambrian Burgess shale.  It was previously interpreted as a red alga.  It has smooth or faintly lineated stems, which branch into up to four equal branches at branching points. 37 specimens of Dalyia are known from the Greater Phyllopod bed, where they comprise 0.07% of the community.

References

External links 
 

Burgess Shale fossils
Prehistoric hemichordate genera
Cambrian genus extinctions